2010 in the Israeli film industry.

Israeli films screened at commercial screenings

The following is a list of Israeli films released in the year 2010.

Unknown release date

Awards

Notable deaths

 January 9 – Nadav Levitan, 64, Israeli film director and screenwriter - lung disease. (born 1945)
 November 9 – Amos Lavi, 57, Israeli actor - lung cancer. (born 1953)

See also
2010 in Israel

References

External links
 Israeli films of 2010 at the Internet Movie Database

Israeli
Film
2010